Grant Mandel Rosenmeyer (born July 3, 1991) is an American actor and screenwriter best known for his roles in The Royal Tenenbaums and on the FOX television sitcom Oliver Beene.

Early life and education 
Rosenmeyer was born in Manhasset, New York, the son of Jewish parents Debra and Colin Rosenmeyer. He grew up in Ridgefield, Connecticut and earned a Bachelor of Fine Arts degree from New York University's Tisch School of the Arts in 2012.

Career
Rosenmeyer first acted on Broadway as Macduff's son in Macbeth and as Gavroche in Les Misérables. In 2001, he made his feature film debut as Ari Tenenbaum, Ben Stiller's son, in Wes Anderson's The Royal Tenenbaums, for which he received a Young Artist Award nomination.

From 2003-2004, Rosenmeyer played the title character in the FOX television sitcom Oliver Beene, produced by Steven Levitan. He has made guest appearances on Late Night with Conan O'Brien, Monk, Jonny Zero, Blue Bloods and Crazy Ex-Girlfriend, among others. He also appeared as Wilson, a Make-A-Wish patient that blackmails Larry David, in a memorable episode of Curb Your Enthusiasm. Additional film credits include Young Mordechai in The Hebrew Hammer.

In June 2009, Rosenmeyer's short film Fugue won the award for Best Student Film at the Connecticut Film Festival. He co-wrote and starred in The Smut Locker, a short comedy which garnered a CINE Golden Eagle Award in 2014. That same year, his feature script The Defectives was a semifinalist for the Nicholl Fellowships in Screenwriting.

He appeared alongside Julia Roberts and George Clooney in the 2016 film Money Monster, directed by Jodie Foster. He also starred opposite Lindsey Shaw in the romantic comedy Temps in 2016, as well as the heist comedy Chasing the Blues in 2018.

Most recently, Rosenmeyer produced and starred in Come As You Are, a road trip dramedy based on the real-life experience of Asta Philpot, opposite Gabourey Sidibe, Hayden Szeto and Ravi Patel. The film premiered at South by Southwest in March 2019 before going on to win numerous audience and jury prizes at other festivals, and was acquired for release by Samuel Goldwyn Films.

Filmography

Film

Television

References

External links

1991 births
American male child actors
American male film actors
American male television actors
Tisch School of the Arts alumni
Living people
People from Manhasset, New York
People from Ridgefield, Connecticut
Male actors from New York (state)
Jewish American male actors
21st-century American male actors
20th-century American male actors